Palicoureeae is a tribe of flowering plants in the family Rubiaceae and contains about 817 species in 11 genera. Its representatives are found in the tropics and subtropics.

Genera
Currently accepted names

 Carapichea  (23 sp.)
 Chassalia  (114 sp.)
 Chazaliella  (20 sp.)
 Eumachia 
 Geophila  (29 sp.)
 Hymenocoleus  (12 sp.)
 Margaritopsis  (27 sp.)
 Notopleura  (100 sp.)
 Palicourea  (358 sp.)
 Puffia  (1 sp.)
 Rudgea  (131 sp.)

Synonyms

 Carinta  = Geophila
 Ceratites  = Rudgea
 Chytropsia  = Margaritopsis
 Colladonia  = Palicourea
 Geocardia  = Geophila
 Gloneria  = Rudgea
 Ipecacuanha  = Carapichea
 Margaris  = Margaritopsis
 Montamans  = Notopleura
 Nettlera  = Carapichea
 Nonatelia  = Palicourea
 Oribasia  = Palicourea
 Pachysanthus  = Rudgea
 Proscephaleium  = Chassalia
 Readea  =  Eumachia
 Rhodostoma  = Palicourea
 Stachyococcus  = Carapichea
 Stephanium  = Palicourea
 Strempelia  = Rudgea
 Viscoides  = Notopleura
 Zwaardekronia  = Chassalia

References

 
Rubioideae tribes